
Erin Soderberg Downing (born October 21, 1976) is an American children's book author. She has written more than 75 books for children, tweens, and adults.

Biography
Erin Soderberg Downing was born October 21, 1976, in Duluth, Minnesota. She grew up in Duluth and later studied at the University of Minnesota, before becoming a children's book editor and marketer while studying for her Master's in Business Administration at NYU in New York City, and also at Stockholm School of Economics in Sweden. Returning to the United States, she took assignments in marketing for various companies around New York City, including Nickelodeon.

In 2000, Soderberg Downing started editing and contributing to several children's books brands, including the Scooby-Doo picture clue books series, published by Scholastic.
After settling in Minneapolis, Minnesota, she started writing her own novels. Soderberg Downing soon began developing several series of children's books, starting with the beloved magical middle-grade series THE QUIRKS (2012–2015), followed by the popular PUPPY PIRATES chapter books (Random House, 2014–2019). Her newest series include "DISNEY'S DARING DREAMERS CLUB" (Random House) and "THE GREAT PEACH EXPERIMENT" (Pixel + Ink). She has also written several standalone middle grade novels, including "MOON SHADOW," "BEST FRIENDS (UNTIL SOMEONE BETTER COMES ALONG)," and the 2022 novel "CONTROLLED BURN" (Scholastic).

Awards
2013: Midwest Connections Pick
September & October 2015: Midwest Independent Booksellers Association Bestseller

Selected fiction bibliography
 Just Keep Walking (2024)
 Controlled Burn (2022)
 The Great Peach Experiment series (2021-2024)
 Daring Dreamers Club series (2019-2021)
 The Quirks series (2012–2015)
 Puppy Pirates series (2014–2016)
 Monkey See, Monkey Zoo (2010)
 Kiss It (2010)
 Drive Me Crazy
 Prom Crashers
 Dancing Queen
 Cheating on Myself
 For Soccer-crazy Girls Only (2014)
 Best Friends – Until Someone Better Comes Along (2014)
 Juicy Gossip

References

External links
  - covers her books for kids
 Erin Soderberg, Random House.
 The Quirks in Circus Quirkus – Wisconsin Book Festival, 2016.

1975 births
Living people
21st-century American poets
21st-century American women writers
Writers from Duluth, Minnesota
American women poets
University of Minnesota alumni